Tado may be:
 Chami language (Colombia)
 Lindu language (Sulawesi)
 Adja language (Benin & Togo)